Goffs, an unincorporated community in San Bernardino County, California, is a nearly empty one-time railroad town at the route's high point in the Mojave Desert. Goffs was a stop on famous U.S. Route 66 until 1931 when a more direct road opened between Needles and Essex. Goffs was also home to workers of the nearby Santa Fe Railroad, with Homer east, Fenner south, and Blackburn and Purdy north.

Goffs was known as Blake between 1893 and 1902. It was named for Isaac Blake, the builder of the Nevada Southern Railway (later the California Eastern Railway 1895–1923)  that commenced here.

An early 20th Century general store is the town's largest building (now abandoned). A historic schoolhouse, built in 1914 and almost totally deteriorated by the early 1980s, has since been renovated to its original plans by the Mojave Desert Heritage and Cultural Association (MDHCA). The schoolhouse and grounds now house a museum primarily specializing in the area's mining history. Remnants of Goffs's mining days still dot the town.

During World War II the town was the home of Camp Goffs a large US army depot and training center.

Goffs is accessible off Interstate 40 at U.S. Highway 95 north. A left turn onto Goffs Road, the pre-1931 alignment of US 66, becomes a desolate forty-mile (64 km) stretch that served as home to several towns that have mostly vanished, including Bannock, Ibis, and the aforementioned Homer. Continuing west on Goffs Road brings motorists back to I-40 northeast of the town of Essex.

Goffs Road is featured in the opening scene of the 1984 cult classic Repo Man.

Goffs is located at the foothills of the northern terminus of the Piute Mountains; the location is also the southern terminus of the Lanfair Valley which drains south from the east region of the Mojave National Preserve. The drainage is the Sacramento Wash which turns due east to meet the Piute Wash, just west of the Colorado River. Goffs is on the foothill bajadas that drain northward into Sacramento Wash.

References

External links 

 
 Brief History of Nevada Southern Railway by Alan Hensher: 2005
  Historic Goffs, California

Populated places in the Mojave Desert
Lanfair Valley
Ghost towns in California
Ghost towns on U.S. Route 66
Unincorporated communities in San Bernardino County, California
Unincorporated communities in California